Eceabat, formerly Maydos (Madytos), is a small town in Çanakkale Province in the Marmara Region of Turkey, located on the eastern shore of the Gelibolu Peninsula, on the Dardanelles Strait. It is the seat of Eceabat District. Its population is 5,636 (2021). The town lies at sea level. It is an almost entirely modern town.

Eceabat is the departure point for the annual swim across the Hellespont to Çanakkale on the other side of the Dardanelles Strait.

Eceabat is the nearest town to the World War I Gallipoli Campaign battlefield sites, as well as to the cemeteries and memorials to the more than 120,000 Turkish, British, French, Australia ad New Zealand soldiers killed during the campaign. This has led to its becoming a major tourism centre, especially around 18 March and 15 April (ANZAC Day) when the two different sides of the struggle commemorate their roles in what happened.

Name 
Eceabat's name might have originated from the Arabic military term "hijabat" which means the most forward command point from the battlefield. If so, the meaning might explain the change from the original Madytos.

Attractions 
Kilisetepe Mound  in Eceabat town covers the site of the original Maydos. The Greek Orthodox church that used to stand on it was demolished in 1923.

Kilitbahir Castle, 11km south of Eceabat, is an architectural  masterpiece, commissioned by Mehmed II in 1462 after the conquest of Istanbul. Süleyman the Magnificent added the Sarı Küle, a beautiful tower of large cut stones, to the original fortifications. The castle's heart-shaped layout is unique. The smooth rubble walls were not given great importance but  the clover-shaped three courtyards of the inner courtyard were still sheltered. The inner castle has seven floors. Bunkers were added to the site during the Gallipoli campaign. There is a small military museum inside the castle. 

Ancient Sestos was on the site of the village of Yalova, Eceabat, 4 km from Eceabat. It was established to the south of Akbaş port. Its stones were reused in the building of Kilitbahir Castle.

Seddülbahir Castle was built in 1659 by Mustafa Ağa, the architect of Frenk Ahmed Pasha, during the reign of Mehmed IV.

Bigali Castle is 5 km from Eceabat. Work on it began in 1807 during the reign of Selim III; it was completed during the reign of Mahmud II. Stones taken from the lost city of Sestos were used to build the castle.

References

External links
 
 
 Road map of Eceabat and environs
 Various images of Eceabat, Çanakkale
 Eceabat

Populated places in Çanakkale Province
Dardanelles
Fishing communities in Turkey
Populated coastal places in Turkey
Eceabat District
Towns in Turkey
Gallipoli Peninsula